The Smartest Kids in the World: And How They Got That Way is a book that analyses and compares various national education systems to the American education system, often in critique.

References

2013 non-fiction books
Simon & Schuster books